Leskiolydella is a genus of parasitic flies in the family Tachinidae.

Species
Leskiolydella aurata Townsend, 1927

Distribution
Brazil

References

Diptera of South America
Exoristinae
Tachinidae genera
Taxa named by Charles Henry Tyler Townsend
Monotypic Brachycera genera